Burton Gorge Dam is located on the Isaac River at AMTD 280.3 km, about 40 km upstream of Moranbah, Queensland, Australia. North Goonyella Coal Properties has a licence to take 1,700 ML/year from the dam. Burton Gorge Dam is owned and operated by RAG Australia Coal subsidiaries.

See also

List of dams and reservoirs in Australia

References

External links
Department of Natural Resources and Mines

Reservoirs in Queensland
Buildings and structures in Central Queensland
Dams in Queensland